Aryan Bora (born 15 November 2000) is an Indian cricketer. He made his first-class debut on 12 February 2020, for Meghalaya in the 2019–20 Ranji Trophy. He made his List A debut on 8 December 2021, for Meghalaya in the 2021–22 Vijay Hazare Trophy.

References

External links
 

2000 births
Living people
Indian cricketers
Meghalaya cricketers
Place of birth missing (living people)